David Lovgren (born November 4, 1969) is a Canadian actor. He had a recurring role in the espionage series Intelligence.

He graduated in theatre at Studio 58, Langara College in Vancouver and began acting at the age of 17. 

Lovgren appeared in the feature films Cool Runnings (1993), Live Bait (1995) and Antitrust (2001). He appeared in two 1999 films that received critical attention: Rollercoaster and Something More. Ken Eisner of Variety wrote that "Lovgren spookily recalls the young Christopher Walken" and Marc Horton of the Edmonton Journal wrote that Lovgren's was the best performance in Something More (1999). His performance in the teen film Rollercoaster (1999) was called "memorable" by Ken Eisner. He received attention for his performance in Off Key (1994), in which he performed nude, when the film screened at the Cannes Film Festival. He performed in the television film Beyond Obsession.

On television, he has performed on many television series shot in Vancouver such as The Commish, The Outer Limits, Smallville, X-Files, Supernatural, Stargate SG-1 and Stargate: Atlantis. 

On the stage, he appeared in a 1997 production at Richmond Gateway Theatre of Death of a Salesman, in which he played Happy Loman, and for which he received positive notice in The Province.

Selected filmography
Cool Runnings (1993)
Off Key (1994)
Live Bait (1995) 
Something More (1999)
Rollercoaster (1999) 
Antitrust (2001)
The Dick Knost Show (2013)

References

External links
 

1969 births
Living people
Canadian people of Norwegian descent
Canadian male film actors
Canadian male television actors
Canadian male voice actors
Male actors from Vancouver
Studio 58 people